A Piece of the Action is a 1977 American crime comedy film directed by and starring Sidney Poitier and co-starring Bill Cosby. It was the third film pairing of Poitier and Cosby, following Uptown Saturday Night (1974) and Let's Do It Again (1975). The films are considered a trilogy, even though the actors play characters with different names in each film. It was also Poitier's last acting role for more than a decade, as he focused his attentions on directing.

Plot
Dave Anderson (Bill Cosby) and Manny Durrell (Sidney Poitier) are two high-class sneak thieves who have never been caught. Joshua Burke (James Earl Jones) is a retired detective who has enough evidence on the both of them to put them behind bars. Instead, he offers to maintain his silence if the crooks will go straight and do work at a youth center for delinquents. At first, the crooks are reluctant and unwilling (and so are the kids). As time goes by they gain the trust and admiration of the kids and they start to enjoy the job. All goes well until a past heist comes back to haunt them and they have to make up for it or else.

Cast
 Sir Sidney Poitier as Manny Durrell
 Bill Cosby as Dave Anderson
 James Earl Jones as Joshua Burke
 Denise Nicholas as Lila French
 Hope Clarke as Sarah Thomas
 Tracy Reed as Nikki McLean
 Titos Vandis as Bruno
 Frances Foster as Bea Quitman
 Pat Renella as Nikos
 Jason Evers as Ty Shorter
 Marc Lawrence as Louie
 Ja'net Dubois as Nellie Bond
 Sheryl Lee Ralph as Barbara Hanley
 Ernest Lee Thomas as John
 Estelle Evans as Alberta Ballard

Reception
Roger Ebert gave the film two stars out of four and wrote: "It has its heart in the right place, I suppose, but its key situations are so unbelievable and its dialog so awkward that nothing helps". Lawrence Van Gelder of The New York Times wrote: "A Piece of the Action is firmly on the side of the angels. It is possible to criticize its lack of originality and its transparent slickness; but these are flaws that must be balanced against its evident craftsmanship, its entertainment and its social conscience". Arthur D. Murphy of Variety noted that "the Warner Bros. release, easygoing and pleasant if longish at 134 minutes, looks good for the general market". Gene Siskel gave the film two stars out of four and called it "a patronizing, simple-minded lecture on how young blacks can get jobs. You probably thought A Piece of the Action was going to be a comedy. It is, but only as an afterthought". Kevin Thomas of the Los Angeles Times praised the film as "uproarious yet poignant", with "generous, spirited direction" from Poitier. Gary Arnold of The Washington Post called the film "a winning light entertainment" with "an exceptionally effective screenplay, which achieves a spirited, tangy blend of conventional caper melodrama, conventional romantic comedy and elonquent propagandizing on behalf of measures intended to encourage self-reliance and self-respect in black juveniles".

Remakes
In 2002, Will Smith and his production company, Overbrook Entertainment, bought the rights to the trilogy for remakes to star Smith and to be distributed by Warner Bros. Smith hoped to get Eddie Murphy, Martin Lawrence and other famous African-American stars for the films.

Soundtrack

References

External links
 
 

1977 films
1970s action comedy films
1970s buddy comedy films
1970s crime comedy films
1970s crime action films
American action comedy films
American buddy comedy films
American crime action films
American crime comedy films
American heist films
Blaxploitation films
1970s English-language films
Films directed by Sidney Poitier
First Artists films
Warner Bros. films
1977 comedy films
1970s American films